Chris Flynn may refer to:

 Chris Flynn (author) (born 1972), Australian author, editor and critic
 Chris Flynn (Canadian football) (born 1966), former Canadian football quarterback
 Christopher Flynn (born 1987), Welsh footballer